The Private Dancer Tour is the fifth concert tour by singer Tina Turner. In conjunction with her fifth studio album Private Dancer (1984), the tour helped to establish Turner as a major solo artist and live performer and is often considered one of the best comebacks in music history. The 180-date tour encompassed Europe, North America, Australia and Asia. Turner also played a show in Budapest, the only show of the tour behind the Iron Curtain. The concerts received additional accolades, receiving an "Most Creative Tour Package Award" and "Comeback Tour Of The Year Award" from Pollstar Awards.

Broadcasts and recordings 

The two shows at the UK's Birmingham NEC Arena in March 1985 were filmed and released as Tina Live: Private Dancer Tour. The VHS release featured special guests Bryan Adams and David Bowie.

Band 
James Ralston – guitar, vocals
Jamie West-Oram – guitar, vocals
Bob Feit – bass guitar
Jack Bruno – drums
Timmy Cappello – percussion, keyboards, saxophone, vocals
Kenny Moore – piano, vocals

Opening acts 

Glenn Frey (North America, select dates)
Mr. Mister (North America, select dates)
John Parr (North America, select dates)
Go West (North America, select dates)
FM (West Germany, April/May 1985)
Strange Advance (Canada) (select dates)
Limited Warranty (Omaha)
Eric Martin Band (Reno)

Setlist 
{{hidden
| headercss = background: #ccccff; font-size: 100%; width: 65%;
| contentcss = text-align: left; font-size: 100%; width: 75%;
| header = Europe
| content =
Act 1
"Let's Pretend We're Married"
"Show Some Respect"
"I Might Have Been Queen"
"River Deep – Mountain High"
"What's Love Got to Do with It"
"Nutbush City Limits"
"I Can't Stand The Rain"
"Better Be Good to Me"
Act 2
"Private Dancer"
"Let's Stay Together"
"Help!"
"It's Only Love"
"Steel Claw"
"Proud Mary"
Encore
"Legs"
"Tonight"
"Let's Dance"

}}
{{hidden
| headercss = background: #ccccff; font-size: 100%; width: 65%;
| contentcss = text-align: left; font-size: 100%; width: 75%;
| header = North America/Australia/Asia
| content =
Act 1
"Show Some Respect"
"I Might Have Been Queen"
"River Deep – Mountain High"
"Nutbush City Limits"
"I Can't Stand The Rain"
"Better Be Good to Me"
Act 2
"Private Dancer"
Act 3
"One of the Living"
"We Don't Need Another Hero (Thunderdome)"
"What's Love Got to Do with It"
"Let's Stay Together"
"Help!"
Act 4
"It's Only Love"
"Steel Claw"
"Proud Mary"
Encore
"Legs"
"Dancing in the Dark"
}}

Tour dates

Box office score data

External links 
International Tina Turner Fan Club – Tour – Private Dancer 1984–1985

References 

Tina Turner concert tours
1985 concert tours